The discography of American hip hop recording artist Chingy, consists of five studio albums, one extended play (EP), eight mixtapes and thirteen singles.

Albums

Studio albums

Mixtapes

Extended plays

Singles

Guest appearances
 2003: "Shorty" (Busta Rhymes featuring Chingy, Fat Joe & Nick Cannon)
 2003: "We Got" (Ludacris featuring I-20, Tity Boi & Chingy)
 2003: "Hot & Wet (Remix)" (112 featuring Ludacris & Chingy)
 2004: "Can't Stop Won't Stop (Remix)" (Young Gunz featuring Chingy)
 2004: "I Like That" (Houston featuring Chingy, Nate Dogg & I-20)
 2004: "Fightin' in the Club" (I-20 featuring Lil Fate, Tity Boi & Chingy)
 2004: "Tipsy (Remix)" (J-Kwon featuring Chingy & Murphy Lee)
 2004: "Circus Music" (Suga Free featuring Chingy)
 2005: "Country Boy (Remix)" (Tyra featuring Chingy & Trillville)
 2005: "Baller" (Young Buck featuring Lil Flip & Chingy)
 2005: "Get Down" (DJ Quik featuring Chingy)
 2005: "Ride Out" (Mack 10 featuring Chingy)
 2005: "My Lowrider" (The Game featuring Chingy, Techniec, E-40, Crooked I, Lil Rob, Paul Wall, Ice Cube & WC)
 2006: "Do It to It (Remix) (Cherish featung Chingy, Yung Joc, Jody Breeze & Fabo)
 2007: "Bartender (Remix)" (T-Pain featuring Chingy & Akon)
 2007: "My Drink n My 2 Step Remix" (Cassidy featuring Chingy, Swizz Beatz & Jermaine Dupri)
 2007: "Celebrity Chick" (with Steph Jones & Small World)
 2008: "So Fly (Remix)" (Slim featuring Chingy, Jadakiss, Chamillionaire, Freeway, 8Ball, Shawty Lo & Busta Rhymes)
 2008: "My Lady" (Tydis featuring Chingy)
 2008: "Wanna Balla" (Soulja Boy Tell'em featuring Chingy, Gucci Mane & Nicki Minaj)
 2009: "Donk Dat" (Yung Ro featuring Chingy & City Spud) 
 2010: "Look at Her Go (Remix)" (Gena featuring Murphy Lee, Chingy & Jibbs)
 2016: "Him" (Omega Crosby featuring Chingy)
 2016: "Get Down" (Solberjum featuring Chingy)
 2018: "Marylin" (Three Guests featuring Chingy)
 2018: "Made It" (Three Guests featuring Chingy)

References

Hip hop discographies
Discographies of American artists